Seaman may refer to:

 Sailor, a member of a marine watercraft's crew
 Seaman (rank), a military rank in some navies
 Seaman (name) (including a list of people with the name)
 Seaman (video game), a 1999 simulation video game for the Sega Dreamcast
 Seaman (dog), on the Lewis and Clark Expedition
 USS Seaman (DD-791), a destroyer
 Seaman, Ohio, a village in the United States

See also
 Seaman Range, a mountain range in Nevada, United States
 Seaman Reservoir, northwest of Fort Collins, Colorado, United States
 Seaman High School, Kansas
 Seaman's Furniture, an American chain of furniture stores
 Seaman's Hospital, Hong Kong, closed in 1873
 Seaman Stadium, a sports venue in Okotoks, Alberta, Canada
 Seaman Farm, Dix Hills, New York, on the National Register of Historic Places
 Seamans (disambiguation)
 Semen